In Dreams may refer to:

Music
 In Dreams (Roy Orbison album) (1963)
 "In Dreams" (Roy Orbison song) (1963)
 In Dreams: The Greatest Hits, a 1987 album by Orbison
 In Dreams (Joseph McManners album)
 In Dreams (After the Burial album) (2010)
 In Dreams (soundtrack), a 1999 soundtrack album
 "In Dreams" (Howard Shore song), a 2003 song from the Lord of the Rings film trilogy
"In Dreams", a song by Vaughan Williams from his cycle Songs of Travel

Film and television
 In Dreams (film), a 1999 film directed by Neil Jordan
 In Dreams (1992 film), a British TV film featuring Patsy Rowlands
 In Dreams: The Roy Orbison Story, a 1999 TV special produced by Paul Cadieux
 "In Dreams", an episode of Teenage Mutant Ninja Turtles
In Dreams (Fear the Walking Dead), an episode of the sixth season of Fear the Walking Dead

Other uses
 In Dreams (book), a 1992 anthology of science fiction and horror stories

See also 
 In My Dreams (disambiguation)
 In Your Dreams (disambiguation)